Xanthonia furcata is a species of leaf beetle. It is found in North America. It is associated with wild cherry and oaks. The specific name comes from the Latin furca, meaning "fork".

Distribution
X. furcata is distributed in Illinois, Missouri, Texas and Oklahoma.

References

Further reading

 

Eumolpinae
Articles created by Qbugbot
Beetles described in 2001
Beetles of the United States